Dragan Župan (born 29 November 1982) is a Croatian football player that currently plays in the Treća HNL for Zagora Unešić.

Career
Župan started his career at Hajduk Split. After that, he played for NK Uskok Klis, HNK Šibenik and NK Posušje. In 2005. he signed for NK Zadar which was at that time playing in Druga HNL. After short episode in Međimurju, in 2006. he returns to Zadarm in which he played for the next three seasons (from which two in Prva HNL), In 2009. he goes to NK Istra 1961 for which he played until 2010 when  he joins third side team NK Raštane. In season 2012/13 he returned to NK Zadar.

References

External links

Profile at HNL statistici

1982 births
Living people
Sportspeople from Zadar
Association football midfielders
Croatian footballers
NK Uskok players
HNK Šibenik players
HŠK Posušje players
NK Zadar players
NK Međimurje players
NK Istra 1961 players
HNK Primorac Biograd na Moru players
NK Zagora Unešić players
Croatian Football League players
First Football League (Croatia) players
Second Football League (Croatia) players